Victoria Jamali, in Persian: ویکتوریا جمالی, is an environmental rights activist and expert in environment law from Iran. She was a founding member of the Women’s Society Against Environmental Pollution and founded the Iranian Society of Environmental Law.

Biography 
Jamali graduated from the University of Aberdeen in 1974, with an Masters qualification in rural and regional resource planning. After graduation she returned to Iran and began work at the Institute of Environmental Studies at the University of Tehran. The Institute continued despite changes wrought by the Iranian Revolution and the Iran-Iraq War, by 1997 it was able to flourish. Earlier in the 1990s, Jamali was approached by her colleague at the University of Tehran, Mahlagha Mallah, to establish an organisation dedicated women and the environment in Iran. In 1993 they founded the Women’s Society Against Environmental Pollution (WSAEP). In 1999 and 2001 she took part in two research visits to the USA sponsored by Environmental Law Alliance Worldwide. 

By 2001 Jamali was Assistant Professor in the Graduate Faculty of Environment at the University of Tehran and was leading research in environmental law in Iran. She founded Iran's first society for environmental law - the Iranian Society of Environmental Law. In 2002 she founded Iran's first environmental law programme, which drew comparisons between her and the American environmentalist John Muir. In order for the programme to be passed she had to convince senior male colleague at Tehran University of its legitimacy. This Environmental Programme, begun by Jamali, had support from the Iranian Vice-President Masoomeh Ebtekar in 2003.

She has been prominent in campaigns including those advocating for reductions in air pollution, protection of the Persian cheetah and vocal about a lack of environmental protection in general in Iran.

As part of her work with WSAEP, Jamali edits the journal فرياد زمين (Faryad-e-Zamin - Cry of the Earth). Jamali has published on environmental law as part of her research; she has also translated academic articles to Persian from English.

Selected publications 
 'Ongoing environmental research of the University of Tehran about the city of Tehran'
 'Traditional irrigation in Iran: Qanat'

References 

Year of birth missing (living people)
Iranian environmentalists
Academic staff of the University of Tehran
Alumni of the University of Aberdeen
Living people